Sir George Ernest Craythorne Hamilton  (born 27 June 1967) is a Northern Ireland retired police officer. From 2014 to 2019, he served as the Chief Constable of the Police Service of Northern Ireland. He was previously the Assistant Chief Constable with responsibility for rural policing.

Early life and education
Hamilton was born on 27 June 1967 in Newtownards, County Down, Northern Ireland. He was educated at Gransha High for Boys, an all-boys state secondary school in Bangor, County Down. He studied politics and economics at the Open University, graduating with a Bachelor of Arts (BA) degree. He also studied at the University of Ulster where he completed a Master of Business Administration (MBA) degree.

Career
Hamilton began his policing career in 1985, when he joined the Royal Ulster Constabulary. In 1994, he was promoted to inspector and seconded to a police force in England.

In 2009, he joined Strathclyde Police as Assistant Chief Constable, returning to the PSNI in 2011 as Assistant Chief Constable Criminal Justice.

Chief Constable
Hamilton was selected to succeed Matt Baggott as the Chief Constable of the PSNI in May 2014, and took up his post in June of the same year. He was awarded the Queen's Police Medal (QPM) in the 2015 Birthday Honours.

In October 2017 Hamilton, along with Deputy Chief Constable Drew Harris and Assistant Chief Constable Mark Hamilton, were placed under investigation by the Police Ombudsman for Northern Ireland. The inquiry focuses on "concerns about how the Police Service of Northern Ireland conducted an investigation into allegations of bribery and fraud in 2014".

In January 2019, Hamilton announced that he would retire in June 2019. He had been offered a three-year contract extension but he rejected it. On 8 June 2019, as part of the Queen's 2019 Birthday Honours for the United Kingdom, Hamilton was made a Knight Bachelor "for services to Policing and to the community in Northern Ireland."

Hamilton was knighted in the 2019 Birthday Honours for services to policing and the community in Northern Ireland.

Honours

References

Living people
Chief Constables of the Police Service of Northern Ireland
Royal Ulster Constabulary officers
British Chief Constables
People from Bangor, County Down
Northern Irish recipients of the Queen's Police Medal
Alumni of the Open University
Alumni of Ulster University
1967 births
Knights Bachelor